The DAX (Deutscher Aktienindex (German stock index)) is a stock market index consisting of the 40 major German blue chip companies trading on the Frankfurt Stock Exchange. It is a total return index. Prices are taken from the Xetra trading venue. According to Deutsche Börse, the operator of Xetra, DAX measures the performance of the Prime Standard’s 40 largest German companies in terms of order book volume and market capitalization. DAX is the equivalent of the UK FTSE 100 and the US Dow Jones Industrial Average, and because of its small company selection it does not necessarily represent the vitality of the German economy as a whole.

The L-DAX Index is an indicator of the German benchmark DAX index's performance after the Xetra trading venue closes based on the floor trading at the Börse Frankfurt trading venue. The L-DAX Index basis is the "floor" trade (Parketthandel) at the Frankfurt stock exchange; it is computed daily between 09:00 and 17:45 Hours CET. The L/E-DAX index (Late/Early DAX) is calculated from 17:45 to 20:00 CET and from 08:00 to 09:00 CET. The Eurex, a European electronic futures and options exchange based in Zürich, Switzerland with a subsidiary in Frankfurt, Germany, offers options (ODAX) and Futures (FDAX) on the DAX from 01:10 to 22:00 CET or from 02:10 to 22:00 CEST.

The Base date for the DAX is 30 December 1987, and it was started from a base value of 1,000. The Xetra technology calculates the index every second since 1 January 2006.

On 24 Nov 2020, Deutsche Börse announced an expansion of the DAX from 30 to 40 members and a tightening of rules in response to the Wirecard accounting scandal. The expansion occurred in the 3rd quarter of 2021.

Versions 
The DAX has two versions, called performance index and price index, depending on whether dividends are counted. The performance index, which measures total return, is the more commonly quoted, however the price index is more similar to commonly quoted indexes in other countries.

Contract Specifications 
DAX futures are traded on the Deutche Borse Indices & ETF exchange (DBIndex). The contract specifications for the DAX Combined Index (ticker symbol DAXA) are listed below:

Price history 
On 16 March 2015, the performance index first closed above 12,000. On 10 April 2015, the price index first closed above its closing high from 2000.

Record values

Annual returns 
The following collapsible table shows the annual development of the DAX, calculated retroactively up to 1950.

Components 
Below is the list of companies which are a component of the DAX 40, as of 27 February 2023. The current stock prices and list of DAX companies are available from financial websites. The index weighting refers to the DAX performance index.

: Weightings as of 1 March 2023

Former DAX components 

This table lists former DAX components and the companies which replaced them.

See also 
Stock market lists
 List of stock exchanges
List of European stock exchanges
Other lists
List of largest German companies
Other stock market indices
 List of stock market indices
CDAX, every listed German company
 HDAX, union of DAX, MDAX and TecDAX (successor to DAX 100, and equivalent of the FTSE 100 or the S&P 100)
 MDAX, the next 50 largest companies after the DAX
 SDAX, the next 70 largest companies after the MDAX
 ÖkoDAX, top 10 companies in renewable energy
 TecDAX, top 30 companies trading in the "new economy"

References

External links 
 Reuters page for .GDAXI
 DAX homepage
 Bloomberg page for DAX:IND
 DAX MOBILE
Eurex Exchange Homepage
Frankfurt Stock Exchange

1988 establishments in West Germany
German stock market indices